Rajesh Masala or Rajesh Spices is an Indian manufacturer, distributor and supplier of ground spices. Rajesh Agrahari and Chandrama Devi Agrahari are directors of Rajesh Masala.

History 

The company was founded in 1997 by the late industrialist R. R. Agrahari under the company banner of Agrahari Masala Udyog, in Amethi, Uttar Pradesh state, India.

Rajesh Masala Private Limited is a Private Company incorporated on 13 February 2004.

Products 
It manufactures and supplies all kinds of basic and mixed spices (or masala), including turmeric, chili, coriander, black and white pepper powder, vegetable masala, chat masala, Damaloo masala, curry powder, incense masala and heeng (Asafoetida) compound.

Other 
Its director Rajesh Agrahari is also called as "Rajesh Masala" due to his brand of spice. He has been a party leader in the Samajwadi Party before his expulsion. He was expelled from SP by CM Akhilesh Yadav in July 2014 due to his involvement in anti-party activities.

References

External links
 

Indian companies established in 1997
Food and drink companies of India
Companies based in Uttar Pradesh
Indian brands
1997 establishments in Uttar Pradesh
Food and drink companies established in 1997